The Accademia di Belle Arti di Catania is an academy of fine arts located in Catania, Sicily. It was founded in 1967 and started its activities in January 1968. As of 2013, it was the third academy of fine arts in Italy for number of students.

References

External links
  

 

Art schools in Italy
Education in Catania
Catania
Educational institutions established in 1976
1967 establishments in Italy